In enzymology, a D-alanine—D-alanine ligase is an enzyme that catalyzes the chemical reaction

ATP + 2 D-alanine  ADP + phosphate + D-alanyl-D-alanine

Thus, the two substrates of this enzyme are ATP and D-alanine, whereas its 3 products are ADP, phosphate, and D-alanyl-D-alanine.

This enzyme belongs to the family of ligases, specifically those forming carbon-nitrogen bonds as acid-D-amino-acid ligases (peptide synthases). The systematic name of this enzyme class is D-alanine:D-alanine ligase (ADP-forming). Other names in common use include alanine:alanine ligase (ADP-forming), and alanylalanine synthetase. This enzyme participates in d-alanine metabolism and peptidoglycan biosynthesis. Phosphinate and D-cycloserine are known to inhibit this enzyme.

The N-terminal region of the D-alanine—D-alanine ligase is thought to be involved in substrate binding, while the C-terminus is thought to be a catalytic domain.

Structural studies

References

Further reading
 
 
 

EC 6.3.2
Enzymes of known structure